William Southcombe Lloyd Webber  (11 March 1914 – 29 October 1982) was an English organist and composer, who achieved some fame as a part of the modern classical music movement whilst commercially facing mixed opportunities. Besides his long and prestigious career, composing works ranging from choral pieces to instrumental items and more, he is known for being the father of both fellow composer Andrew Lloyd Webber and virtuoso cellist Julian Lloyd Webber. He also notably served as a teacher, instructing pupils on music theory at the Royal College of Music for many years until his death in 1982.

Childhood 

Webber was born in London. The son of William Charles Henry Webber, a self-employed plumber, he was fortunate that his father was a keen organ 'buff' who spent what little money he had travelling to hear various organs in and around the capital. Often he would take his son with him and, before long, young William started to play the organ himself and developed a keen interest that bordered on the obsessional.

By the age of 14, William Lloyd Webber had already become a well-known organ recitalist, giving frequent performances at many churches and cathedrals throughout Great Britain. He won an organ scholarship to the Mercers' School, later winning a further scholarship to study at the Royal College of Music, where he studied with Ralph Vaughan Williams and gained his FRCO diploma at nineteen. Because there was already another student at the college with the name William Webber, William continued to use his second middle name 'Lloyd' from then on as part of his last name.

Prolific years

Lloyd Webber's earliest known composition is the "remarkably assured" Fantasy Trio in B minor for violin, cello and piano of 1936 (which didn't receive its premiere until 1995). In 1938, he was appointed organist and head of the choir school at All Saints, Margaret Street, in the Marylebone district of London. He later became musical director at Westminster Central Hall, London, the headquarters of the Methodist church in the United Kingdom. His first compositions developed in the 1930s. In 1942 he married the pianist and violinist Jean Hermione Johnstone (1921–1993). The marriage, which lasted until his death, produced two sons: composer Andrew (born 1948) and cellist Julian (born 1951).

From 1945 until the 1960s, Webber composed vocal and instrumental music, choral and organ works, chamber music and orchestral works. Compositions from this period include the oratorio St. Francis of Assisi (1948), the orchestral tone-poem Aurora (1948), and the six Country Impressions (1960), each movement for a solo woodwind instrument and piano. There are also sonatinas for viola and flute, numerous songs, organ pieces and choral works. But Webber's roots were firmly embedded in the romanticism of such composers as Sergei Rachmaninov, Jean Sibelius and César Franck, and he became increasingly convinced that his own music was 'out of step' with the prevailing climate of the time. Rather than compromise his style, he turned to the academic side of British musical life. He taught at the Royal College of Music, directed the choir of Westminster Central Hall, and in 1964 was appointed Director of the London College of Music, a post which he held until his death in 1982.

Selected works

Orchestra
 Lento in E major for string orchestra (1939)
 Waltz in E minor for orchestra (1939)
 Aurora, Tone Poem for orchestra (1948)
 Three Spring Miniatures for small orchestra (1952); orchestration of original piano work
       Gossamer (A Little Waltz)
       Willow Song (A lament)
       Tree Tops (A Toccatina)
 Serenade for Strings for string orchestra
       I. Barcarolle (1951)
       II. Romance (1980)
       III. Elegy (1960)
 Invocation for harp, timpani and string orchestra (1957)

Brass band
 Little Suite for brass
       I. Prelude
       II. Adagio
       III. Festival March

Chamber music
 Three Pieces for cello and piano
       In the Half-Light (1951)
       Air Varié (adapted from Tantum Ergo by César Franck)
       Slumber Song
 Fantasy Trio in B minor for violin, cello and piano (1936)
 Sonatina for flute and piano (1941)
 Benedictus for violin and organ (1942)
 Nocturne for cello and piano or harp (1948); from the oratorio St. Francis of Assisi
 Sonatina for viola and piano (1951)
 Air and Variations for clarinet and piano (1952)
 Suite in B for trumpet and piano (1952)
 Country Impressions (1960)
       Mulberry Cottage for flute and piano (1960)
       On Frensham Pond, Aquarelle for clarinet and piano (1960)
 A Lyric Suite for cello and piano (1964)
 Summer Pastures for horn and piano
 The Gardens at Eastwell, A Late Summer Impression for violin and piano or harp (1982)

Choral
 Missa Sanctae Mariae Magdalenae for choir and organ (1979)
 Missa Princeps Pacis (The Prince of Peace), mass for chorus and organ (1962)
 , A Meditation upon the Death of Christ for chorus and organ
 The Divine Compassion, Sacred Cantata for tenor, baritone, chorus and organ
 St. Francis of Assisi, Oratorio for soprano, tenor, baritone, chorus, string orchestra and harp (1948)
 Born a King, a Christmas cantata for soloists, chorus and organ
 Songs of Spring, Cantata for female chorus and piano
 O Lord, Spread Thy Wings O'er Me, Anthem for soprano (or treble voice), chorus and accompaniment
 Spirit of God, Anthem for chorus and organ
 Dominus Firmamentum Meum, Anthem for chorus and organ
 Lo! My Shepherd Is Divine, Anthem for soprano, alto, chorus and organ
 Lo, God Is Here, Anthem for chorus and organ
 Seven Anthems
 Sing the Life, Easter Carol for chorus and accompaniment
 A Hymn of Thanksgiving for unison voices and organ
 O Love, I Give Myself to Thee for female chorus and organ
 O for a Closer Walk with God for chorus and organ
 Then Come, All Ye People, Carol for chorus and accompaniment
 The Lord Is My Shepherd for chorus and organ
 Love Divine, All Loves Excelling for chorus and organ (1964); from The Good Samaritan
 Tantum Ergo, Anthem for bass solo, chorus and organ
 Jesus, Dear Jesus, Carol for boy treble, children's choir and organ
 The Stable Where the Oxen Stood
 Most Glorious Lord of Lyfe, Anthem Suitable for Easter for chorus; words by Edmund Spenser
 Meeting Place, a Meditation upon the Birth of Christ for baritone, chorus and piano or organ (1964)
 Jamie Brown, a Happy Story in Song for two-part chorus and piano (published 1962)
 Magnificat and Nunc Dimmitis in E minor

Partsongs
 April for female chorus and piano
 Corinna's Lute for female chorus and piano
 Sun-Gold for female chorus and piano; words by May Sarson
 Moon Silver for female chorus and piano
 Lament for female chorus and piano
 I heard a Rush of Wings for female (or children's) chorus and piano
 The Moon for unaccompanied chorus
 A Magic Morn for female chorus and piano
 The Heather Hills for female chorus and piano

Vocal
 The Call of the Morning (1950); words by George Darley
 Love, Like a Drop of Dew (1950); words by W. H. Davies
 I Looked Out into the Morning (1951); words by James Thomson (B.V.)
 Over the Bridge (1951); words by James Thomson (B.V.)
 How Do I Love Thee?
 The Forest of Wild Thyme (1951)
 The Pretty Washer-Maiden; words by William Ernest Henley
 To the Wicklow Hills (1954); words by R.G. Leigh
 A Rent for Love (1982); words by Irvonwy Morgan
 So Lovely the Rose; words by Joseph Murrells
 Eutopia; words by Francis Turner Palgrave
 The Cottage of Dreams
 Lullaby
 Spring Is the Time for Love
 Three Arias for tenor and organ
       And I Saw a New Heaven
       The King of Love (from The Saviour)
       Thou Art the King (from The Divine Compassion)

Piano
 Three Spring Miniatures (1952); also orchestrated
       Gossamer (A Little Waltz)
       Willow Song (A lament)
       Tree Tops (A Toccatina)
 Italian Idyll, 3 Piano Duets (1954)
       Mattinata
       Siesta
       Napolitana
 Six Pieces
       A Song for the Morning (1957); composed under the pseudonym Clive Chapel
       Scherzo in G minor
       Arabesque
       Romantic Evening
       Explanation; composed under the pseudonym Clive Chapel
       Song without Words
 Three Pieces
       Presto for Perseus
       Autumn Elf
       Badinage de Noël
 Scenes from Childhood
       Cake Walk
       Sentimental Waltz
       Air
       Scherzo
       Evening Hymn
       China Doll
 A Short Tone-Study
 River Song for piano 4-hands
 Danse Macabre for 2 pianos

Organ
 Chorale, Cantilena and Finale
 Three Recital Pieces (1952)
       Prelude
       Barcarolle
       Nuptial March
 Aria, 13 Pieces
       Prelude on St Cross
       Choral March
       Communion
       Solemn Procession
       Prelude on Passion Chorale
       Prelude on Rockingham
       Festal March
       Prelude on Gerontius
       Aria
       Verset
       Prelude on Winchester New
       Vesper Hymn
       Meditation on Stracathro
 Reflections, 7 Pieces
       Prelude
       Slumber Song
       Summer Pastures
       Romance
       Intermezzo
       Christ in the Tomb (from The Divine Compassion)
       Postlude
 Eight Varied Pieces
       Arietta in A major
       Minuet
       Recessional
       Andantino alla Cantilena
       Introit
       Dedication March
       Pastorale
       Epilogue
 Songs without Words, 6 Pieces
       Noel Nouvelet
       Song without Words
       Trumpet Minuet
       God Rest You Merry, Gentlemen
       The Coventry Carol
       Good King Wenceslas
 Five Portraits for home organs
 Elegy
 Six Interludes on Christmas Carols
       Interlude on 'The Holly and the Ivy'
       Interlude on 'Whence is this goodly fragrance?'
       Interlude on 'Noël nouvelet'
       Interlude on 'Good King Wenceslas'
       Interlude on 'Coventry Carol'
       Interlude on 'God Rest You Merry, Gentlemen'
        Rhapsody on "Helmsley"
 Four Epilogues (for Frederick Geoghegan) (1953)
       I. Allegro moderato
       II. Risoluto
       III. (Resurgam) Andante elegiaco
       IV. Maestoso, ma con anima
 ''Suite in B-flat Major for Organ" (To Frank Netherwood) (1951)
       I. Prelude
       II. Fugal Allegro
       III. Minuet
       IV. Choral Song

Discography
 Music of William Lloyd Webber, (ASV Digital, CD DCA 961, 1996)
 Organ Works of William Lloyd Webber, (Priory, PRCD 616, 1998)
 William Lloyd Webber piano music, chamber music and songs, (Hyperion, CDA67008, 1998)
 Sacred Choral Music of William Lloyd Webber, (Priory PRCD677, 1999)
 Invocation, (Chandos CHAN 9595, 1998)

References

External links
 William Lloyd Webber's biography
 William Lloyd Webber's Facebook page
  by the London Philharmonic Orchestra conducted by Lorin Maazel
 Guardian article written by Julian Lloyd Webber about his father, 16 April 2004
 William Lloyd Webber: An Impressionistic View by John France
 Review of William Lloyd Webber Centenary Concert.

English classical organists
British male organists
English classical composers
20th-century classical composers
Composers for piano
Sacred music composers
Child classical musicians
Musicians from London
Fellows of the Royal College of Organists
Academics of the Royal College of Music
Alumni of the Royal College of Music
Commanders of the Order of the British Empire
People educated at Mercers' School
English Anglicans
1914 births
1982 deaths
20th-century English composers
English male classical composers
Lloyd Webber family
20th-century organists
20th-century British male musicians
Male classical organists